Jaitpur is a town in Kulpahar sub-district of Uttar Pradesh. It lies at a distance of 10 km from Kulpahar on Kulpahar-Nowgong Highway. The famous Belasagar lake is situated in this town.

History
Jaitpur was the former capital of Jaitpur State, one of the former princely states in the British Empire in India. There were two forts in the area.
In Jaitpur Bajirao peshwa defeated mughal general Muhaamad Khan Bangash In 1729.

References 

Villages in Mahoba district
Former capital cities in India